Nammoora Raja (Kannada: ನಮ್ಮೂರ ರಾಜ) is a 1988 Indian Kannada film,  directed by  H. R. Bhargava. The film stars Vishnuvardhan, Manjula Sharma, Jai Jagadish and Mukhyamantri Chandru in the lead roles. The film has musical score by Rajan–Nagendra. P. Vasu, the story writer of this film remade the movie in Tamil as Vaathiyaar Veettu Pillai.

Cast

Vishnuvardhan as Raja
Rajesh
Manjula Sharma
Jai Jagadish
Aparna
Sangeetha
Mukhyamantri Chandru as Lakshmipathy
Sathyajith 
Rajanand
Phani Ramachandra as Umapathy
Kunigal Nagabhushan
Jayaram Reddy 
Shivaprakash
Bemel Somanna
Janardhan
Negro Johnny
Srishaila as Sharada
Shankar Bhat
Ramamurthy
Janaki
Disco Shanthi as Gouri

Soundtrack

References

External links
 
 

1988 films
1980s Kannada-language films
Films scored by Rajan–Nagendra
Indian action films
Kannada films remade in other languages
Films directed by H. R. Bhargava
1988 action films